Zhytkavichy District or Zhytkavichy Raion is a district of Gomel Region, in Belarus. In this district the 3rd largest lake of the country Chervonoye Lake is situated.

References 

 
Districts of Gomel Region